Morning Consult is a business intelligence company established in 2014. It was named one of the fastest growing technology companies in North America by Deloitte in both 2018 and 2019 and was valued at more than one billion dollars in June 2021. The company specializes in online survey research technology and has offices in Washington, D.C., New York City, Chicago, and San Francisco.

Morning Consult provides global survey research tools, data services and news to organizations in business, marketing, economics, and politics. The company's proprietary brand tracking platform, Brand Intelligence, tracks over 3,000 companies, products, and individuals across 40 countries by surveying tens of thousands of people every day on each brand it tracks.

History 
Morning Consult was founded in 2014 by CEO Michael Ramlet, President Kyle Dropp and CTO Alex Dulin. It started with a poll looking at whether young and uninsured Americans were going to sign up for the Affordable Care Act's insurance exchanges, published just before the exchanges went live in 2013. The White House used that polling in its briefing later that day.

Initially operating from a row house near Capitol Hill, the firm went from 13 employees in 2014 to 255 in November 2020.

In 2015, the company published a report on the "Shy Trump" voter in the Republican presidential primaries. The claim has since been challenged.

In February 2016, Morning Consult partnered with Vox to conduct polling on topical stories in politics and culture. In June 2016, Morning Consult launched the Morning Consult Brand Index in Fortune magazine's annual release of the Fortune 500 list and began polling with Bloomberg News on investor sentiment.

During the 2016 U.S. presidential election, Morning Consult and the political journalism company Politico published a weekly polling partnership on "political issues, personalities and media aspects that affect the daily debate". The polling relationship continued after the 2016 election and is released weekly in Politico Playbook.

The company's polling results for the 2016 U.S. presidential election showed a closer race than other pollsters.

In 2017, Morning Consult launched its survey research technology product, Brand Intelligence. The survey research technology platform uses daily interviews with thousands of Americans to provide daily tracking on nearly 3,000 companies, products and services.

Morning Consult conducts regular survey research with The New York Times.

In October 2017, the company opened an office in New York City and then in Chicago and San Francisco in 2018.

In 2018, the company announced it was partnering with The Hollywood Reporter for a weekly polling series on what Americans think about the hottest news and trends in Hollywood.

In May 2020, Morning Consult completed a $31 million Series A funding round. The funding includes capital from James Murdoch's Lupa Systems, Advance Venture Partners and others. The funding values the company at $306 million. 

In June 2021, Morning Consult raised a $60 million Series B funding round led by Advance Venture Partners with additional investors Susquehanna Growth Equity and Lupa Systems. Following this round of funding, the company is valued at over $1.01 billion.

On January 18, 2023, the company announced an internal restructuring program laying off 47 employees, approximately nine percent of its workforce, across all divisions.

Polling and methodology 
Morning Consult conducts scientific online polling. It uses a stratified sampling process and multiple nationally recognized vendors to gain access to tens of millions of Americans. After fielding, Morning Consult applies weights based on age, race/ethnicity, gender, educational attainment, and region (determined by 2016 Current Population Survey).

During the 2016 presidential election, Morning Consult had one of the most accurate national polls: despite calling the winner of the election incorrectly, it successfully predicted Hillary Clinton winning the national popular vote by 3 percent (she won by 2.1 percent). The website FiveThirtyEight also found that Morning Consult, along with other prolific online polling firms, did not have a strong house effect in its 2016 election polling.

Survey on approval ratings
This company conducts surveys on the approval ratings of the leaders of major economies.

Brand Intelligence 
In the spring of 2017, Morning Consult launched Brand Intelligence, a survey research and media monitoring platform. The platform tracks over 2,000 public-facing brands and products across 12 countries, and offers subscribers access to data on their companies as well as competitors. For each brand that is tracked, Morning Consult conducts 200 interviews per day.

Brand Intelligence also provides social media listening and media monitoring services, aggregating results from over 85,000 news outlets.

In October 2017, data from Brand Intelligence was cited in the New York Times showing changes in survey results on the NFL's brand after President Donald Trump criticized the league on Twitter.

Economic Intelligence 
Morning Consult launched its Economic Intelligence product in the fall of 2019, and in the spring of 2020 as it began to identify the dip in consumer confidence with the continued coronavirus outbreak. The Federal Reserve cited the company's data in its emergency meeting March 15, 2020.

The data is regularly referenced in the media, with past citations including The Associated Press, The New York Times, The Wall Street Journal, and The Washington Post.

References

External links
 
 Morning Consult Intelligence

American companies established in 2013
Polling companies
Online companies of the United States
Public opinion research companies in the United States
Public opinion research companies
Companies based in Washington, D.C.